Oenopota admetoides is a species of sea snail, a marine gastropod mollusk in the family Mangeliidae.

Description

Distribution
This species occurs in the Sea of Japan.

References

 Okutani, T. "Bathyal and abyssal Mollusca trawled from Sagami Bay and the south off Boso Peninsula by the R/V Soyo-Maru, 1965–1967." Bulletin of the Tokai Regional Fisheries Research Laboratory 56 (1968): 7–55.

External links
 

admetoides
Gastropods described in 1968